Cherish Violet Blood is a Kainai actress and storyteller from Canada. She is most noted for her performance as Marie in the 2021 film Scarborough, for which she won the Canadian Screen Award for Best Supporting Actress at the 10th Canadian Screen Awards in 2022.

Prior to her film debut in Scarborough, she was known for her leading role as Lila in a touring stage production of Tara Beagan's play Deer Woman. For Scarborough, she also received a Vancouver Film Critics Circle nomination for Best Supporting Actress in a Canadian Film at the Vancouver Film Critics Circle Awards 2021.

References

External links

21st-century Canadian actresses
Canadian film actresses
Canadian stage actresses
First Nations actresses
Canadian storytellers
Actresses from Alberta
Best Supporting Actress Genie and Canadian Screen Award winners
Living people
Year of birth missing (living people)
Kainai Nation people